James Francis Fulloon (12 August 1840 – 22 July 1865) was a New Zealand interpreter and public servant. He was born in Whakatane, Bay of Plenty, New Zealand on 12 August 1840.

References

1840 births
1865 deaths
Interpreters
New Zealand public servants
People from Whakatāne
19th-century translators